FIFO may refer to:

First in, first out
First in, first out describes a method of managing items in storage.

 FIFO in stock rotation, particularly to avoid food spoilage
 FIFO (computing and electronics), a method of queuing or memory management
 Queue (abstract data type), data abstraction of the queuing concept
 FIFO and LIFO accounting, methods used in managing inventory and financial matters

People
Fifó (born 2000), Portuguese futsal player

Other uses
FIFO (film festival) (Festival International du Film Documentaire Océanien), documentary film festival held in Tahiti
 FiFo Records, an American record label
 Fly-in fly-out, a human resources strategy for deployment of personnel to remote locations

See also
 LIFO (disambiguation)
 First expired, first out (FEFO)